Mosalla Imam Khomeini Metro Station is a station in Tehran Metro Line 1. It is located in Mosalla-ye Tehran next to Resalat Expressway. It is between Shahid Beheshti Metro Station and Shahid Hemmat Metro Station.

References

Tehran Metro stations